Tony is a 1982 Indian Kannada-language action film directed by H.R. Bhargava and produced by Mohan Sharma and Jairaj Singh. The film stars Ambareesh, Lakshmi and Srinath.

Cast 
 Ambareesh 
 Lakshmi
 Srinath 
 Sundar Krishna Urs
 Dinesh
 Shakti Prasad
 Shivaram
 Musuri Krishnamurthy
 Srilalitha
 Shobha
 Tiger Prabhakar in a guest role
 Uma Shivakumar in a guest role

Soundtrack 
The music was composed by Rajan–Nagendra, with lyrics by R. N. Jayagopal and Doddarangegowda. All the songs composed for the film were received extremely well and considered as evergreen songs.

References 

1982 films
1980s Kannada-language films
Indian action films
Films scored by Rajan–Nagendra
Films directed by H. R. Bhargava
1982 action films

kn:ಟೋನಿ